Evergestis consimilis is a moth in the family Crambidae. It was described by Warren in 1892. It is found in North America, where it has been recorded from Arizona, California, Colorado and Texas. Adults are on wing from May to August.

References

Evergestis
Moths described in 1892
Moths of North America